D. elegans may refer to:

 Dacryopinax elegans, a jelly fungus species
 Damias elegans, a moth species
 Deinacrida elegans, a weta species
 Dendronotus elegans, a sea slug species
 Dendropsophus elegans, a frog species endemic to Brazil
 Diaphania elegans, a moth species
 Dichomeris elegans, a moth species
 Dichromorpha elegans, the short-winged grasshopper, an insect species
 Dicranurus elegans, a Lower Devonian lichid trilobites species
 †Diegocanis elegans, a cynodont species from the Triassic of Argentina
 Dilophodes elegans, a moth species
 Ditha elegans, a pseudoscorpion species in the genus Ditha found in Indonesia
 Dolbina elegans, a moth species
 Dolichoderus elegans, an extinct ant species
 Dolomedes elegans, a spider species
 Dorcadion elegans, a longhorn beetle species
 Dorymyrmex elegans, an ant species
 Dosinia elegans, a bivalve mollusc species
 Downingia elegans, a flowering plant species
 Drosophila elegans, a fly species found in Taiwan and the Philippines
 Drupa elegans, a sea snail species
 Dynoides elegans, an isopod species found in California

Synonyms 
 Dendrobium elegans, a synonym for Crocodeilanthe elegans, an orchid species
 Dendroclavella elegans, a synonym for Clavelina elegans, a tunicate species
 Drotus elegans, a synonym for Calliprason elegans, a beetle species found in New Zealand